Angaria is a Union Parishad in Rajapur Upazila of Jhalokati District in the Dhaka Division of southern-central Bangladesh.

References

External links
 Satellite map at Maplandia.com

Populated places in Jhalokati District